"Because We Want To" is a song performed by British pop singer Billie. The song was written by Wendy Page, Jim Marr, Dion Rambo and Jacques Richmond, and produced by Page and Marr for Billie's debut album Honey to the B (1998). It was released as her debut single on 29 June 1998 and entered the UK Singles Chart at number one in July 1998, making Piper the youngest artist to debut at number one, at age 15. It also reached the top 10 in Ireland, New Zealand, and Sweden. The song was the official theme of the 1999 FIFA Women's World Cup.

Chart performance
Selling over 80,000 copies during its opening week, "Because We Want To" made Billie the youngest artist to debut at number one on the UK Singles Chart, aged 15. However, Helen Shapiro still holds the record as the youngest solo female singer to have topped the UK Singles Chart; "You Don't Know" rose to number one in 1961, when Shapiro was 14 years and 10 months old. Outside the United Kingdom, the song became a top-10 hit in Ireland, New Zealand, and Sweden, peaking at numbers nine, nine, and eight, respectively. Although the song became a hit in Canada, peaking at number 14 on the Canadian Singles Chart and number 30 on the RPM 100 Hit Tracks chart in September 1998, it did not chart in the United States.

Music video
The video (directed by Phil Griffin) starts in a run-down street in London, where the ground is violently shaking. The reason is soon seen: A UFO is flying just metres from the ground. Billie is then seen teleporting from the ship and down onto the street. She starts singing and dancing and soon gathers huge crowds of supporters. In the video, cut scenes of Billie and her friends walking down side streets are seen. In one scene, she melts a bin which transforms into a dancing humanoid and in another scene she graffitis "Billie" on a billboard and an animated character then jumps from the billboard and dances along with the humanoid made from the melted bin. Later in the video, she and her friends sneak into a warehouse and have a party.

Track listings

UK 7-inch jukebox single and European CD single
 "Because We Want To" (radio mix) – 3:45
 "G.H.E.T.T.O.U.T." – 4:19

UK CD1, Canadian and Australasian CD single
 "Because We Want To" (radio mix) – 3:45
 "G.H.E.T.T.O.U.T." – 4:19
 "Because We Want To" (Sgt. Rock 'Old Skool' mix-edit) – 4:11
 "Because We Want To" (Tall Paul v's Billie mix) – 8:47

UK CD2
 "Because We Want To" (radio mix) – 3:45
 "Because We Want To" (street mix featuring Sweet P) – 5:12
 "Because We Want To" (radio mix instrumental) – 3:45
 "Because We Want To" (video)

European cassette single
A1. "Because We Want To" (radio mix) – 3:45
A2. "G.H.E.T.T.O.U.T." – 4:19
B1. "Because We Want To" (Tall Paul v's Billie mix) – 8:47

US 12-inch single
A1. "Because We Want To" (Tall Paul vs. Billie)
A2. "Because We Want To" (radio mix)
B1. "Because We Want To" (Sgt. Rock Old Skool mix)
B2. "Because We Want To" (street mix)

Charts

Weekly charts

Year-end charts

Certifications

|}

References

1998 debut singles
1998 songs
1999 FIFA Women's World Cup
Billie Piper songs
Innocent Records singles
Songs written by Jim Marr
Songs written by Wendy Page
UK Singles Chart number-one singles
Virgin Records singles